It All Ends Up In Tears is the sixth studio album by Australian jazz musician Vince Jones, released in October 1987.

At the ARIA Music Awards of 1988 it won the ARIA Award for Best Jazz Album.

Track listing
 "If You're Goin' to the City" (Mose Allison)
 "Jettison" (Vince Jones)
 "Five O'Clock in the Morning" (Joe Williams)
 "Budgie" (Vince Jones)
 "You Don't Know What Love Is" (Don Raye, Gene DePaul)
 "Rainbow Cake" (Paul Grabowsky, Vince Jones)
 "Comes Love" (Charles Tobias, Les Brown, Sam H. Stept)
 "But Beautiful" (Jimmy Van Heusen, Johnny Burke) 
 "A Sweet Defeat" (Paul Grabowsky, Vince Jones)
 "Circle in the Square" (Paul Grabowsky, Vince Jones)
 "It All Ends Up in Tears" (Vince Jones)

Charts

References

1987 albums
Vince Jones albums
ARIA Award-winning albums
Jazz albums by Australian artists